The 18th Academy Awards were held on March 7, 1946 at Grauman's Chinese Theatre to honor the films of 1945. Being the first Oscars after the end of World War II, the ceremony returned to the glamour of the prewar years; notably, the plaster statuettes that had been used during the war were replaced by bronze statuettes with gold plating. 

Despite the optimistic postwar mood, director Billy Wilder's grim and socially significant drama The Lost Weekend won the major awards of Best Picture and Best Director, as well as two other awards. It was the first film to win both Best Picture and the Palme d'Or at the Cannes Film Festival. 

Best Actress nominee Joan Crawford was absent, claiming she had pneumonia (although it was said it was because she was sure she would not win the Oscar for Mildred Pierce). When she won, the award was delivered to her, still in bed, later that night.

This was the first year in which every film nominated for Best Picture won at least one Oscar, and also the first time a sequel (The Bells of St. Mary's) was nominated for Best Picture.

Awards

Nominations announced on January 27, 1946. Winners are listed first and highlighted in boldface.

Academy Honorary Award
Walter Wanger "for his six years service as President of the Academy of Motion Picture Arts and Sciences".
The House I Live In  tolerance short subject; produced by Frank Ross and Mervyn LeRoy; directed by Mervyn LeRoy; screenplay by Albert Maltz; song "The House I Live In", music by Earl Robinson, lyrics by Lewis Allan; starring Frank Sinatra; released by RKO Radio.
Republic Studio, Daniel J. Bloomberg and the Republic Sound Department "for the building of an outstanding musical scoring auditorium which provides optimum recording conditions and combines all elements of acoustic and engineering design.

Academy Juvenile Award
Peggy Ann Garner

Presenters
Ingrid Bergman (Presenter: Best Actor)
Charles Boyer (Presenter: Best Actress)
Frank Capra (Presenter: Best Film Editing, Best Sound Recording and Best Special Effects)
Bette Davis (Presenter: Writing Awards)
Y. Frank Freeman (Presenter: Short Subject Awards)
D. W. Griffith (Presenter: Best Cinematography)
Van Heflin (Presenter: Best Supporting Actress and Best Supporting Actor)
Eric Johnston (Presenter: Best Picture)
George Murphy (Presenter: Honorary Award to Peggy Ann Garner)
Donald Nelson (Presenter: Honorary Awards)
Ginger Rogers (Presenter: Best Art Direction)
Cesar Romero and Peter Viertel (Presenters: Show Introduction)
William Wyler (Presenter: Best Director)

Performers
Kathryn Grayson
Dick Haymes
Dinah Shore
Frank Sinatra

Multiple nominations and awards

The following thirty films received multiple nominations:
 8 nominations: The Bells of St. Mary's
 7 nominations: The Lost Weekend
 6 nominations: Mildred Pierce, A Song to Remember and Spellbound
 5 nominations: Anchors Aweigh, National Velvet
 4 nominations: The Keys of the Kingdom, Leave Her to Heaven, Love Letters, The Story of G.I. Joe and Wonder Man
 3 nominations: Objective, Burma!, The Picture of Dorian Gray and The Southerner
 2 nominations: Belle of the Yukon, Can't Help Singing, The Corn Is Green, Flame of Barbary Coast, A Medal for Benny, Rhapsody in Blue, San Antonio, State Fair, They Were Expendable, A Thousand and One Nights, The Three Caballeros, Tonight and Every Night, A Tree Grows in Brooklyn, The Valley of Decision and Why Girls Leave Home

The following two films received multiple awards:
 4 wins: The Lost Weekend
 2 wins: National Velvet

See also
3rd Golden Globe Awards
1945 in film

References

Academy Awards ceremonies
1945 film awards
1946 in Los Angeles
1946 in American cinema
March 1946 events in the United States